Viztel Solutions Berhad is involved in the business of developing and marketing of voice technologies and telecom software services.

It is a fast-growing technology firm that was publicly listed on the MESDAQ Market of Bursa Malaysia (MESDAQ: VIZTEL, 0050) since July 2004. The Group has business presence in South East Asia, Greater China, Middle East and USA.

History 
Viztel Solutions Group or Viztel Solutions Berhad was founded in 1999 by 4 engineers, namely Lau Kin Wai, Pang Hao Chen, Chong Kam Hoe and Tan Heng Kiat.

References

External links 
Systech Berhad (MYX: 0050), bursamalaysia.com
Software Company Overview of Viztel Solutions Bhd, bloomberg.com

Defunct companies of Malaysia
Companies formerly listed on Bursa Malaysia
Companies disestablished in 2011
1999 establishments in Malaysia
2011 disestablishments in Malaysia
Companies formerly listed on MESDAQ
Malaysian companies established in 1999
Software companies established in 1999